is a Japanese visual novel by Nippon Ichi Software and Broccoli. It was released on October 24, 2013 for the PlayStation Portable. An anime television series adaptation by Sony Pictures Animation was announced in December 2013 and aired from April to June 2014. The opening theme for the anime was "Till the end", while the ending theme for the anime was "Reason for...". Both opening and ending theme were sung by Miyu Irino, Daisuke Ono, Yuto Uemura, Toshiyuki Toyonaga, Hiroshi Kamiya, and Yoshimasa Hosoya. A second game, was released in April 2016.

Gameplay
Ludere Deorum is classified as an otome game. Like most otome games, the player takes the role of the main female character, Yui Kusanagi, who can choose from a variety of male characters as her love interest.

Plot
Yui Kusanagi is the daughter of a Shinto shrine priest. She discovers a mysterious sword, which transports her to a different world where she meets the Greek god Zeus. He invites her to attend a school in a separate world that he created. Zeus intends to teach the meaning of love to the various young divine beings who also attend the school, in an attempt to reverse the weakening bond between humans and the gods.

The second game shares the same premise, with new routes and new endings for the characters.

The first game allows Yui to romance Apollon, Hades, Tsukito, Takeru, Balder, Loki, Anubis, and Thoth, the first six being the anime's main cast. The second game allows Yui to romance Dionysus, Akira, Thor, and Melissa as well.

Characters

The main protagonist of the series. Yui is a normal high school girl approaching graduation, and is starting to get worried about her future. She’s a little more traditional than most other girls due to her upbringing at a shrine. Yui regularly practices swordplay, and she is rather good at it. She is chosen as the one human to attend a school for gods who have grown distant from humans. She’s now responsible for teaching gods about being human, and about love. Yui is a hardworking and focused girl when it comes to teaching the gods about current human life, and tries her best to educate them. She is very persuasive to the gods, as she managed to encourage Hades, Loki and Takeru to come to school, when they were absolutely uninterested in it. Selfless and caring, she is able to bond with the other gods well. 
 

 The Greek God of the Sun and Zeus's son. He is the only character who calls Yui 'Fairy' with the reason of Yui looking like one. He is very attached to and protective of Yui. He is carefree and happy-go-lucky type of person. He calls the other Gods with weird nicknames such as Bal-Bal for Balder Hringhorni and Dee-Dee for Dionysus Thyraos. He looks and behaves like a noble. He likes to be motivated by different things and is a charismatic leader, shown by the fact that he was elected as the student council president. He is very cheerful, but can be seen as overenthusiastic at times. He tends to say things twice regardless of the situation. Although he seems like a perfect guy, it still seems like something is lacking. He looks cheerful and bright, but he is actually very lonely. He tries to make friends wherever he goes by doing things for them. In the end, he falls in love with Yui.

 The Greek God of the Underworld. He is also said to have misfortune and often isolates himself from interacting with others. Quiet person and takes distances from other people. Apollon’s uncle and Zeus’ older brother. Likes sweet things. Thinks of himself as unlucky and cursed. He has an aura which makes everyone difficult to approach him. Despite being cold outside actually Hades is soft on the inside. He believes that coming close to him will bring misery to people, so he keeps everyone away from him. Due to the grudges held by the dead in the underworld, Hades has gained a curse that causes misfortune wherever he goes, hence he prefers to stay in the underworld away from contact.

Japanese God of the Moon - Tsukiyomi. He is quiet and sometimes painfully blunt. He is the big brother of Susanoo Totsuka Takeru, the Japanese God of the Sea. He always take notes about whatever Yui says regarding humans. He is assigned by Thoth Caduceus to be the disciplinary head. Tsukito seems cool, not interested in anything and rarely shows expressions. Nevertheless he is responsible and dutiful. Although he is an unsociable person, he somehow always gets involved with Apollon and gets dragged into the problem. He sees the idea of the school as just another task and tries to perform it without getting emotionally involved. He enjoys moon gazing, being god of the Moon.Like his brothers, Tsukito was born from Izanagi's washing of himself in the waters of Yomi. Nothing much about him has been revealed, except that he managed to calm Takeru's rampage, and received a rabbit charm from him at some point.

 Japanese God of the Sea - Susanoo God of the sea. Short tempered and brash, he often gets into fights without realising it. He calls Yui 雑草 (weed). However, he eventually likes and becomes protective of Yui after he finds that they have common interests, such as running or swordsmanship. He worships his elder brother Tsukito, but has a difficult relationship with Akira. Surprisingly, he can get emotional rather easily. Doesn’t really get along well with anyone except Tsukito and Hades (whom he admires due to being the god of the underworld). He prides himself in swordplay and is very skilled in it. To calm down, he likes to take walks by the beach, being a god of the sea. Takeru finds animals cute, and sometimes plays with Tsukito's familiar, Usamaro. Takeru relates being born in the waters of Yomi together with his brothers. He lost his temper often, and was exiled because he was thought to have killed a goddess in anger. In reality, though, he loved the goddess in a maternal way and attempted (but failed) to save her as she accidentally fell off a cliff. Takeru also had a close relationship with Tsukito, after the former reaching out to him when he went on another rampage, Takeru began to look up to Tsukito.

 Norse God of Light. Balder is a cheerful god who attracts every person to him because of his good looks. He often trips where there is nothing to be tripped on. He absolutely loves meat and will eat it for every meal if he could. Balder has a carnivorous personality and is very forward when it comes to making his advances on Yui. He cannot be harmed by any object because his mother Frigg made a pact with all objects on earth not to harm him. Even when there is rain, there comes a magical barrier that protects him from it. The only thing that could harm him is a mistletoe. Childhood friends with Thor Megingjard and Loki Laevatein. He has a special feelings for the heroine Yui, and becomes very possessive of her. He starts demanding that she eats with him every night, and gets jealous of anyone (even Loki) spending time with her. There are several instances where he expresses hostile and cruel thoughts about those who give or receive affections from Yui.

 Norse God of Fire. He is very attached to Balder and Thor. Due to him being very mischievous, people avoided him when he was young. He stated in Episode 7 that Balder should only look at him and Balder only belongs to him. He was the last one to know that Yui Kusanagi is a human who represents humanity. He calls her "kitty-cat" and truly hates her when he sees her spending time with Balder, but later softens up to her when he sees that she really wants to be his friend. He is a born prankster, is good at making weapons, and has a pocket full of candy and pranks. Lazy with most things but to things he finds interesting he goes all out. He is a person with unprecedented, unpredictable behavior. He makes mistakes with an unforgiving smile, innocent mass of evil. Genius in making problems anywhere, even in a School. The type of person that always want to know anything, even another person’s problem. His mood is not easy to read. Loki was a notorious troublemaker in Asgard, so many shunned him and hated him. Balder was the only one who befriended Loki despite all his troubles, hence Loki sees Balder as a precious friend. Some mentioned memories include watching the aurora together with Thor, as well as walking along in the snow, since Asgard is said to be a very cold place.

 Norse God of Thunder. He is the one who stated that Balder and Loki shares a very special bond. Thor is a silent and stoic character who says few words. Yet he is very perceptive about people around him and is the voice of reason behind his two fellow Norse gods. He does care for them a lot, and is very worried about their impending fates.

 Greek God of Wine and Merrymaking. Dionysus is a charming flirt with a happy-go-lucky personality, even though he doesn't like to be told what to do. He is said to be warm but slightly crazy. He is sometimes seen appreciating wine. He seems to know a lot about the matters of love. He is said to be the brother of Apollon and nephew of Hades.

 Egyptian God of Knowledge. God of wisdom and creation and responsible for awaking of the world. He is the type of guy who exerts a lot of pressure on his students. He loves corn to the point of having it for three meals every day, and spends most of his time in the library. Thoth has the ability to speed read and devour as much information from the books that he has read. He is responsible for the leadership and is a tutor in the school. Very proud and confident, he does not take consultations if he is not in the mood. Since he knows everything in the universe, he cannot be debated with. He seems very interested about the aspect of humanity and quizzes Yui about the meaning of these questions.

 The Greek God of Sky and Thunder and The Ruler of Mount Olympus. Zeus is a very demanding man who gets what he wants with his power and words. Although seeming forceful and tyrannical, he keeps the future of humanity and gods in mind.

Egyptian God of the Dead. Anubis has a straight ancient egyptian bob, with tufts resembling ears. Instead of the normal school uniform top he wears a skintight suit exposing the midriff, and wears his school blazer over it. He wears a striped belt around his waist and gladiator sandals. In deity his outfit is closer to ancient Egyptian clothing, and he grows jackal ears, tail and claws. Like the rest of the gods his eyes turn gold. Anubis is a shy deity who rarely appears in public and always hides in the shadows. Despite his shyness he has a curious side. He speaks unique words that only Thoth can understand. Only trusts Thoth at first, but opens up to the rest later on. He likes hanging around animals a lot, because he feels closer to them and they have no sin. He usually spends his time exploring outside or staying in the library with Thoth.

 A doll created by Zeus to look after Yui while at the school. He is a yellow and white rag doll with stitches around his mouth, neck, and limbs. His right eye is pink and his left eye is green. He has three marks in the middle of his forehead. His head is also tied like a sack with a green ribbon with a pink button. Melissa is a funny and relaxing doll to be around. He has a kind manner and is liked by the characters, especially Yui. Melissa is fun to be around and acts serious when there is a need to. He is very responsible. He is given a human form in the second game, with a blond ponytail, one green eye and one red eye.

 Japanese God of the Sun. He is feminine in appearance, with long white hair that fades to blue. He is the older brother of Tsukito and Takeru. He is harsh on Tsukito but nice to Takeru, however Takeru dislikes his treatment of Tsukito. He is said to be already interested in the affairs of humans.

Anime
The anime has opening theme, "TILL THE END", and ending theme, "REASON FOR...". Both are performed by the voice actors of Apollon, Hades, Tsukito, Takeru, Balder, and Loki.

References

External links
 
 

2013 video games
Anime television series based on video games
Brain's Base
Japan-exclusive video games
Mythology in anime and manga
Nippon Ichi Software games
Otome games
PlayStation Portable games
PlayStation Portable-only games
Male harem anime and manga
Romance anime and manga
Sentai Filmworks
Supernatural anime and manga
Visual novels
Video games based on Egyptian mythology
Video games based on Greek mythology
Video games based on Norse mythology
Video games based on multiple mythologies
Video games developed in Japan
Broccoli (company) games